The Great Dam (Czech: Velká přehrada) is a 1942 Czech drama film directed by Jan Alfréd Holman and starring František Vnouček, Karel Hradilák and Adina Mandlová.

The film's sets were designed by the art director Bohumil Hes. Shooting took place in Prague, including on the Vltava River.

Main cast
 František Vnouček as Jan Hejtmánek 
 Karel Hradilák as Leo Berka 
 Adina Mandlová as Irena Berková 
 Josef Gruss as Fred Dokoupil 
 Nataša Gollová as Učitelka Marína 
 Jaroslav Průcha as Betonář Barták 
 Miroslav Svoboda as Projektant Michal 
 Martin Raus as Projektant Karel 
 Eva Prchlíková as Kavanová 
 Jarmila Švábíková as Elsa

References

Bibliography 
 Hana Kubátová & Jan Láníček. The Jew in Czech and Slovak Imagination, 1938-89: Antisemitism, the Holocaust, and Zionism. BRILL, 2018.

External links 
 

1942 films
Czech drama films
1942 drama films
1940s Czech-language films
Films directed by Jan Alfréd Holman
Films shot in Prague
Czech black-and-white films
1940s Czech films